Zurich Cantonal Bank (or ZKB) is the largest cantonal bank and fourth largest bank in Switzerland, as well as the leading financial services provider in the Greater Zurich area, with total assets of over CHF 150 billion.

ZKB, as an independent, incorporated public-law institution, is wholly owned by the Canton of Zurich. Ultimate supervision of ZKB is the responsibility of the Cantonal Council of Zurich, whose duties are laid down in Zurich's Cantonal Bank Act.

Under the law, the canton of Zurich bears responsibility for all ZKB's liabilities should the bank's resources prove inadequate. This cantonal guarantee acts as a stabilising force for the financial market as a whole, particularly in times of economic uncertainty.

History
The Zurich Cantonal Bank was founded in 1870 as "bank of the citizens of Zurich" following an initiative of Johann Jakob Keller (1823–1903), then member of the cantonal council of Zurich. The canton of Zurich provided the necessary endowment capital and appointed the senior governing bodies. The public service mandate and the corresponding social and political responsibility were established by law.

In October 2009, Global Finance magazine rated ZKB at one of the five safest banks in the world, on the basis of it being one of only five financial institutions that enjoyed a triple Standard & Poor's, Fitch and Moody's AAA/Aaa rating globally.

In November 2013, Zürcher Kantonalbank was classified as a systemically important bank in Switzerland by order of the Swiss National Bank, alongside UBS, Credit Suisse, Raiffeisen (Switzerland) and PostFinance, and must meet stricter capital requirements and prepare contingency plans for times of crisis.

Network
With 103 outlets, ZKB is the largest network of branches in the canton of Zurich.

ZKB also maintains a network of international representatives and regional advisory offices in Beijing, Mumbai, Singapore, Panama, and Sao Paulo. ZKB also has a branch in Austria (Salzburg).

ZKB Gold ETF 
On 15 March 2006, Zurich Cantonal Bank launched the ZKB Gold ETF, which is listed in Switzerland under the symbol ZGLD. The fund invests exclusively in physical gold. The ETF has three unit classes traded in different currencies: USD, EUR, and CHF. Shares are sold in 1 ounce gold units, with a minimum purchase of one unit (one ounce).

Units are normally bought and sold for cash. For payment in kind, only integral 12.5 kg ingots are assured (subject to the total holding). The NAV is based on closing prices on the New York exchange according to Bloomberg Golds Comdty HP.

See also

Cantonal bank
List of Banks in Switzerland
Gold exchange-traded fund

Notes and references

External links 

 

Cantonal banks
Banks established in 1870
Banks based in Zürich